Auckland Film Studios, formerly known as Henderson Valley Studios, is New Zealand's largest film studio complex, located in Henderson, West Auckland. Entrances to the complex are on Hickory Ave, Henderson Valley Road and Rabone Street, Henderson.

The complex was originally built as insulated fruit store houses, hence their nickname, the 'cool stores'. Henderson Valley Studios have been used as film studios since 1994 when they were occupied by the television series Hercules and Xena, but since these shows ended, the studios have been home to such films and television shows as:
 Whale Rider
 Boogeyman
 In My Father's Den
 The Lion, the Witch and the Wardrobe
 30 Days of Night
 Maddigan's Quest
 Matuku
 Bridge to Terabithia
 Deceit
 No. 2
 Are You Smarter than a 10 Year Old?
 The Warrior's Way
 Legend of the Seeker

The studios are also used for countless television commercials.

The studios are laid out over a 4ha site, between Henderson Valley Rd and Railside Ave. Within this site are 4 (soon to be 5) Sound Stages, 2 Production Office spaces, Prop and Costume workshops, as well as various commercial film related operations.

In late 2006, New Zealand's biggest sound stage began construction at Henderson Valley Studios scheduled for completion in mid-2007. This sound stage is purpose built and bigger than that owned by Peter Jackson at his Stone St Studios complex in Wellington.

The studios have been owned by Enterprise Waitakere, the business arm of the Waitakere City Council since 2002. It is because of studios such as Henderson Valley, South Pacific Pictures and Studio West, that West Auckland has been dubbed 'Westiewood'.

External links 
 Henderson Valley Studios
 Investment New Zealand article
 Press release
 IMDB references

Film studios
Film production companies of New Zealand
Film production companies of the United States
Mass media in Auckland
Mass media in Austin, Texas
West Auckland, New Zealand